Galt High School''' is one of three high schools in Galt, California. A part of the Galt Joint Union High School District (GJUHSD), it is accredited by WASC.

In addition to serving portions of Galt, it also serves all GJUHSD students in San Joaquin County, except for those in the New Hope School District.

History 
Galt High School was established on October 19, 1911 as a result of Dr. Montegue combining efforts with J.W. Reese to form a high school district in Galt, California. The city of Galt had an election to decide whether Galt High should be built. The vote tally was 141 yes and 40 no.  In 1911 after the opening of the school, there were six teachers, three females and three males. The first subjects taught were English, Latin, Math, composition, and music. The first graduate of Galt High was Katherine Reynolds.

The first official high school was built in 1913. The second Galt High School was burned down in 1924. The third Galt High was completed in 1927. This school was built prior to earthquake safety laws and was ordered to be demolished in 1948. The school the students attend now is the fourth Galt High School.  
In the 2011–2012 school year, to celebrate Galt High School's 100 years of history, Galt alumni searched for fellow graduates to join the celebration. Galt High School had a week-long celebration which included an alumni football game, rallies, contests for boys and girls, and floats made by current and past high school students.

The class of 2012 changed the name of the Galt High library to V. Nunez-M. Yenokida library. It was named after Vesta Nunez and Michiye Yenokida, who served twelve and twenty-seven years, respectively, as Galt High's librarians.

Their school colors are red and white with black trim, and their school mascot is the Warrior. 
             
https://commons.erau.edu/cgi/viewcontent.cgi?article=1139&context=jaaer by FG Mitchell - 1994
In 1925, Galt High School in California established the first recorded public school flight-training. The flight and aviation education offered there quite likely represents the first application of aerospace education to the magnet school concept in the United States 

ref: The Healdsburg Tribune, Enterprise and Scimitar 7 June 1929 Article by Homer L Roberts relates that  "and particularly its principal, William Rutherford, the “flying schoolmaster,” were thrown under a cloud by a grand Jury investigation"  where he mismanaged funds relating to the Galt Union High School, the principal subsequently resigned and the Flying School was discontinued.

Galt High School also has an agricultural department, which is connected with the organization Future Farmers of America. Vocational Agriculture started in 1922 and Galt joined FFA in 1929, but it was not organized until 1938.  The Agriculture department, coined the AG-department, with classes including Agricultrtal Environmental Science, Integrated AG Biology, AG Physiology/Anatomy, AG Economics and Government. The electives are Mechanics, Floral Design, Construction, and Leadership. There have been twelve past state California State FFA officers from Galt. The first was the 1974-1975 Treasurer Dennis Johnson. The most recent were Maico Ortiz, State Sentinel and Mia Arisman, State Secretary, both of whom were elected to serve from 2020 to 2021. Dane White, an AG teacher at Galt High, was the State Sentinel in 1999-2000 and he was the National President from 2001–2002. Over the years, Galt has won many awards, including the 2010-2011 National Champions Marketing Plan Team.

According to the 2011-2012 Student Handbook, general graduation requirements for graduation include passing the California High School Exit Exam; Acquiring 220 credits; successfully completing all prescribed courses; and earning no fewer than 50 semester credits per year in each of the first three academic years of high school in order to be considered progressing.

In 1936, Galt High school chose Willy the Warrior as the mascot to replace the milkers. Later the mascot was changed to the chiefs but now the current mascot is the warrior.

A giant oak tree that sits in the center of the school was planted September 27, 1949 in honor of three Class of 1939 students who were killed in action while fighting in the Pacific Theater during WWII.

Nowadays, the school offers activities such as rallies, spirit weeks, Friday lunch activities. There are frequent fire drills, earthquake drills, and even shooting type scenarios. GHS holds an assembly each year for freshmen to prevent gang associations.

In the years leading up to the 2009–2010 academic years, Galt High School faced problems of overcrowding because it was the only school available in the area. Students from Galt, Herald, Wilton, Acampo, and Thornton all attended Galt High. A second high school, Liberty Ranch High, was built to offset the large number of students from the increasing population of the Central Valley.

In February 1997, Galt High's criminal justice class was subjected to a search via drug-sniffing dogs.  A student, Chris Salamo, refused the search and was escorted to the principal's office where his personal belongings were searched.  The search turned up no evidence of illegal drug paraphernalia.  A student's jacket created a false alarm with the dogs, but the student wanted a police officer present before the search continued.  Nothing illegal was found on either of the students in the classroom.  Due to this random search the ACLU was contacted and a lawsuit was filed, claiming an invasion of privacy, which is unconstitutional.  Galt High Board of Trustees agreed to drop the drug-sniffing dog program if the lawsuit was also dropped.  Part of the agreement was also to remove the suspension of Salamo.

Athletics 
Galt High School has many sports teams. Fall sports including football, volleyball, cross country and girls' golf. Winter sports including wrestling, soccer and basketball. And spring sports including softball, baseball, swim, track and field, tennis and boys' golf. Additionally, cheer and color guard teams are offered, but aren't currently recognized on campus as athletic teams. An annual Powder Puff football game, in which girls play flag football, is usually held in the fall during Homecoming Week.

Alumni Zach Phillips and Ryan Mattheus, both of whom made Major League Baseball debuts in 2011, have had their jersey numbers retired by their alma mater.
Philip Ricci- Euro Basketball Champ
Sacramento Kings coaching staff.

The varsity soccer team made it to the section finals, but they lost their section finals against Vista Del Lago, 1–0. None of the original enlisted players were kicked off the team for poor grades. Javier Munoz, a senior and team captain, was able to obtain a full scholarship to Sacramento State University due to his performance and leadership. GHS boys' soccer team made an outstanding season for year 2012–13. Later going on to win a Sac Joaquin Section D5 Championship the year following. Later going on to win 3 more CIF Sac Joaquin Championship (2016,2018,2019) under the coaching of Dane White and Alfredo Renteria. They have succeeded to win 4 CIF Sac-Joaquin Section D4 Championships in 6 years, most recently in 2019, led by Maico Ortiz and Nathan Villalobos. Nathan Villalobos left Galt High School as the most decorated athlete in school history winning 4 preseason tournaments, 4 Sierra Valley Conference Championships, 3 CIF Sac-Joaquin Section D4 Championships and a Sierra Valley Conference All League Selection, while playing Varsity Boys' Soccer for 4 years.

Galt High Schools football has won many section Championships: 1940, 1942, 1943, 1944, 1949, 1951, 1952, 1953, 1956, 1964, 1969, 1973, 1974, 1975, 1982

Galt High Warrior's Section Championships include nine titles 
85-86 Division III Football, 88-89 Division III Football, 92-93 Division III Softball, 93-94 Division III Softball, 95-96 Division II Softball, 
97-98 Division II Boys Basketball, 13-14 Division V Boys Soccer, 15-16 Division IV Boys Soccer, 17-18 Division IV Boys Soccer, 18-19 Division IV Boys Soccer

For the first time in eighty-nine years, Galt High School football forfeited a game due to previous injuries, in the preseason of 2012.  The team only had fourteen players that were able to play in the game against Argonaut High School.

Currently, GHS is in the Division IV, Sierra Valley Conference (SVC) in the CIF Sac-Joaquin Section competing against Bradshaw Christian, El Dorado, Liberty Ranch, Rosemont and Union Mine.

In order to participate in extracurricular activities and athletics, students must maintain a C average grade or a 2.0 GPA.  Activities such as student council and FFA requires a higher grade point average of 3.0.  Students who receive grades below a C or 2.0 GPA but above a 1.49 average are eligible to receive a one time waver during their four years of attending Galt High School.

Visual and Performing Arts
The VAPA  Academy Pathway is the school's visual performing arts program that allows students to major and minor in specific fields of visual and performing arts as they prepare for college. The Visual Arts has ceramics and 2-D art programs, and houses an art gallery named after Steve Klein, a 35-year ceramics teacher at GHS, now retired. It is also the home to artist Adam Reeder who took over the ceramics program shortly after Mr. Klein's retirement. The school's Performing Arts system is shared with the other high schools in Galt. The Infinite Theatre Group and the Galt Liberty Unified Ensembles (GLUE) are district-wide programs. GLUE includes marching band, concert band, winter percussion, and choir. The band has been running since the beginning of the school.  The school is also home to The Infinite Theatre Group, headed by theatre director and teacher, James F. Nunes. Under his leadership, the theatre department continues to produce theatre productions for students, teachers, and the community. The ITG is also active in local theater festivals such as Lenaea and Mother Lode where they have been recognized with awards for playwriting, acting, and tech. James Nunes passed away on October 13, 2017.

Clubs 
Galt High School offers clubs and organizations, including ACE Mentor, Art Club, Asian Culture Club, Aztec Club, BEST Academy, California Scholarship Federation (CSF), Drama Club, Future Farmers of America (FFA), G-tech, German, GTV, Interact, Key Club, Letterman Honor Society (LHS), and Migrant Program.

Galt FFA Champion Teams and Individuals
National Championship - Agricultural Issues team 2017 
National Championship - Agricultural Issues team 2016
National Reserve Championship - Agriscience Fair 2009

References 

Educational institutions in the United States with year of establishment missing
High schools in Sacramento County, California
Public high schools in California
1911 establishments in California